Between Two Shores may refer to:

 Between Two Shores (Vika and Linda album)
 Between Two Shores (Glen Hansard album)